Sampson flow is defined as fluid flow through an infinitely thin orifice in the viscous flow regime for low Reynolds number. It is derived from an analytical solution to the Navier-Stokes equations. The below equation can be used to calculate the total volumetric flowrate through such an orifice:

The flow can also be expressed as a molecular flux as:

Sampson flow is the macroscopic analog of effusion flow, which describes stochastic diffusion of molecules through an orifice much smaller than the mean-free-path of the gas molecules. For pore diameters on the order of the mean-free-path of the fluid, flow will occur with contributions from the molecular regime as well as the viscous regime, obeying the dusty gas model according to the following equation: 

As it turns out, for many gasses, we notice equal contributions from molecular and viscous regimes when the pore size is significantly larger than the mean-free-path of the fluid, for nitrogen this occurs at a pore diameter of 393 nm, 6.0× larger than the mean-free-path.

References

Fluid dynamics